Isaac Asimov Presents The Great SF Stories 24 (1962) is an American collection of science fiction short stories, the twenty-fourth volume in the Isaac Asimov Presents The Great SF Stories,  a series of short story collections, edited by Isaac Asimov and Martin H. Greenberg, which attempts to list the great science fiction stories from the Golden Age of Science Fiction. They date the Golden Age as beginning in 1939 and lasting until 1963. This volume was originally published by DAW books in January 1992.

Stories 
 "The Insane Ones" by J. G. Ballard
 "Christmas Treason" by James White
 "Seven-Day Terror" by R. A. Lafferty
 "Kings Who Die" by Poul Anderson
 "The Man Who Made Friends with Electricity" by Fritz Leiber
 "Hang Head, Vandal!" by Mark Clifton
 "The Weather Man" by Theodore L. Thomas
 "Earthlings Go Home!" by Mack Reynolds
 "The Streets of Ashkelon" by Harry Harrison
 "When You Care, When You Love" by Theodore Sturgeon
 "The Ballad of Lost C'Mell" by Cordwainer Smith
 "Gadget vs. Trend" by Christopher Anvil
 "Roofs of Silver" by Gordon R. Dickson

Notes

24
1992 anthologies
DAW Books books
Martin H. Greenberg anthologies
1962 short stories